Ntiero Effiom (22 November 1946 – 10 September 2014) was a Nigerian football coach who managed Pelican Stars and the Nigeria women's national football team.

References

1946 births
2014 deaths
Nigerian football managers
Nigeria women's national football team managers
2007 FIFA Women's World Cup managers